Ranadhir Chandra Sarma Sarkar, I.A.S. (1908–2000) was an Indian bureaucrat and civil servant. He was the 11th chairman of the Union Public Service Commission of India from May 1971 to February 1973. He served as the Law Secretary of Government of India. He has authored various books and articles in various journals related to law which have been referred to by other academics. In 1973-74, Sarkar was part of the committee set by All India Panchayat Parishad, along with S. K. Dey and headed by Laxmi Mall Singhvi. The committee's report helped in granting the constitutional status to the Panchayati Raj. He studied at Presidency University, Kolkata.

Works 

 An Approach to the Constitution of India, 1981
 The Press in India, 1984 
 Union-State Relations in India, 1986
 The Constitution of India, 1991

References

1908 births
2000 deaths
Chairmen of Union Public Service Commission